Ghar Ki Baat Hai is an Indian Hindi television sitcom on NDTV Imagine in 2009.

Cast 

 Ali Asgar as Various characters
 Sumeet Raghavan as Rajdeep Yagnik
 Juhi Babbar as Radhika Yagnik
 Swapnil Joshi as Kapil Kumar
 Malini Naalappa as Malini
 Deven Munjal as Bhupinder Ahluwalia
 Jay Thakkar as Happy Singh Ahluwalia
 Jayati Bhatia as Dolly Ahluwalia

Guest 
 Juhi Chawla
 Shreyas Talpade
 Farah Khan
 Irfan Khan

References

External links 
 Official site

Imagine TV original programming
2009 Indian television series debuts
2009 Indian television series endings
Indian television sitcoms
Red Chillies Idiot Box